Winslow War Memorial is located in High Street, Winslow, Buckinghamshire, England. It is a grade II listed building with Historic England and commemorates men who died in the First World War with later additions for the Second World War, Malayan Emergency and Falklands Conflict. It was unveiled in 1920.

References

External links

Grade II listed monuments and memorials
Grade II listed buildings in Buckinghamshire
British military memorials and cemeteries
World War I memorials in England
World War II memorials in England
Buildings and structures completed in 1920
Winslow, Buckinghamshire